Sophie Mounicot (born 6 August 1960) is a French actress and writer.

Theater

Filmography

References

External links 

1960 births
French television actresses
French film actresses
Actresses from Paris
Living people
20th-century French actresses
21st-century French actresses